Carolineskolen is a Jewish private school in Copenhagen, Denmark. Pupils are taught Hebrew as an addition to the normal school subjects. The religion lessons cover a broad variety of religions, as it is normal in Denmark, but the main focus is Judaism.

See also 
 Jews in Denmark
 Kundby case

Sources 

Jewish schools
Religious schools in Denmark
Buildings and structures in Østerbro
1810 establishments in Denmark
Judaism in Copenhagen
Private schools in Copenhagen